Banca Leonardo S.p.A. is a private and independent investment bank.

It operates, directly and through its subsidiaries, in the Wealth Management business in Italy.

History 
Banca Leonardo S.p.A. was founded in Milan in October 1999.

In April 2006, a group of leading European investors acquired and recapitalised Banca Leonardo with the purpose of creating the first private and independent investment bank in Italy and becoming the market leader through highly developed consulting services, a differentiated and long-term individual approach, value-added services, professionalism and expertise.

In July 2007, Banca Leonardo acquired a stake in Toulouse & Associés, a French investment bank led by Jean-Baptiste Toulouse and Jean Peyrelevade. It then acquired the rest of the shares it did not own in Toulouse & Associés in September 2008.

In October 2015, the group sold its investment bank activities in Belgium, Germany, Italy and Spain to Houlihan Lokey. While offices in Belgium, Germany and Spain now operate under the Houlihan Lokey brand, the Italian office has retained the Leonardo & Co. brand. In May 2015, the group had sold its investment banking activities in France to Natixis, now operating under the name Natixis Partners.

In December 2016, the group sold its French private banking activities to UBS France.

In May 2018, 94.1% of the shareholding of Banca Leonardo was acquired by Indosuez Wealth Management, a subsidiary of Groupe Crédit Agricole.

As of today, thanks to several key investments and financial transactions aimed at strengthening its core business, Banca Leonardo operates in the Wealth Management business, in Italy.

Legal information 
Banca Leonardo S.p.A.

Piazza Cavour, 2 - 20121 - Milan

Tax Code and VAT number: 09535880158

Main Shareholders 

 Indosuez Wealth Management (Groupe Crédit Agricole): 99.8%

References

External links 
 Sito ufficiale 

Banks of Italy